Spinitectus is a genus of nematodes belonging to the family Cystidicolidae.

The genus has almost cosmopolitan distribution.

Species:

Spinitectus acipenseri 
Spinitectus agonostomi 
Spinitectus aguapeiensis 
Spinitectus aguapeiensis 
Spinitectus anguillae 
Spinitectus asperus 
Spinitectus carolini 
Spinitectus cristatus 
Spinitectus echenei 
Spinitectus gabata 
Spinitectus gigi 
Spinitectus gordoni 
Spinitectus gracilis 
Spinitectus guntheri 
Spinitectus inermis 
Spinitectus jamundensis 
Spinitectus macrospinosus 
Spinitectus mirabilis 
Spinitectus notopteri 
Spinitectus oviflagellis 
Spinitectus palmyraensis 
Spinitectus palmyraensis 
Spinitectus polli 
Spinitectus tamari

References

Nematodes